Somewhere Else is a 1993 album by free jazz composer, bandleader and keyboardist Sun Ra released on the Rounder label. The album consists of tracks recorded in late 1989, at the same sessions which produced the albums Blue Delight and Purple Night, but it was not released until shortly before Sun Ra's death, over three years later.

Reception
The Allmusic review by Scott Yanow awarded the album 4 stars stating "Due to the variety and very interesting personnel, plus many examples of the keyboardist/leader stretching himself, this somewhat obscure effort is easily recommended to Sun Ra collectors".

Track listing
All compositions by Sun Ra except as indicated. All arrangements by Sun Ra.
 "Priest" - 4:01 
 "Discipline/Tall Trees in the Sun" - 8:26 
 "'S Wonderful" (George Gershwin, Ira Gershwin) - 5:32 
 "Hole in the Sky" - 7:31 
 "Somewhere Else Part 1" - 8:38 
 "Somewhere Else Part 2" - 2:41 
 "Stardust from Tomorrow" - 4:56 
 "Love in Outer Space" - 12:01 
 "Everything Is Space" - 3:57 
 "Tristar" - 3:31 
Recorded at Variety Recording Studios in New York in December 1988 (tracks 1 & 8-10) and at BMG Studios in New York City in November 1989 (tracks 2-7)

Personnel
Sun Ra - piano, synthesizer
Don Cherry - pocket trumpet
Fred Adams,  Michael Ray, Ahmed Abdullah, Jothan Callins, Al Evans - trumpet
Tyrone Hill, Julian Priester - trombone
Reynold Scott - baritone saxophone, flute
James Spaulding - alto saxophone, flute
Marshall Allen - alto saxophone, flute, percussion
John Gilmore - tenor saxophone, percussion
James Jacson - bassoon, Ancient Egyptian Infinity Drum
Rollo Radford - electric bass
John Ore, Jaribu Shahid - bass
June Tyson - vocals, violin
Billy Higgins, Thomas "Bugs" Hunter, Earl "Buster" Smith, Eric "Samurai" Walker - drums
Elson Nascimento - surdo, percussion
Jorge Silva - repinique, percussion
Carl LeBlanc - Soloist, Guitar

References 

Sun Ra albums
Rounder Records albums
1993 albums